Kanibonzon or Kani-Bonzon (Kǎ:n-bɔ̀ⁿzɔ̂ⁿ) is a small town and commune in the Cercle of Bankass in the Mopti Region of Mali. It is part of the Kani village cluster. In 1998 the commune had a population of 9,497.

Twin cities
  Podenzano, Italy

References

Communes of Mopti Region